is a Japanese figure skater. She is the 2018 CS Asian Open silver medalist, the 2017 Asian Trophy silver medalist, and the 2018 Coupe du Printemps bronze medalist. Earlier in her career, she won gold medals at two ISU Junior Grand Prix events and finished within the top five at three World Junior Championships (2016, 2017, 2019).

Career

Early years
Shiraiwa began skating in 2006, after being inspired by Shizuka Arakawa's 2006 Olympic victory. Mie Hamada became her coach when Shiraiwa was six years old.

She competed at the 2014–15 Japan Junior Championships but did not qualify for the free skate, having ranked 27th in the short program.

2015–2016 season
Shiraiwa debuted on the ISU Junior Grand Prix (JGP) circuit during the 2015–16 season. At her first JGP assignment, in Colorado Springs, Colorado, she placed fifth in the short program and first in the free skate, winning the gold medal by a margin of 8.06 points ahead of silver medalist Marin Honda. Ranked third in the short and first in the free, she outscored Russia's Alisa Fedichkina by 0.42 for gold at the JGP in Logroño, Spain. Shiraiwa's results qualified her for the JGP Final in Barcelona.

In November, Shiraiwa won the silver medal at the 2015-16 Japan Junior Championships behind Wakaba Higuchi. A month later, at the JGP Final, Shiraiwa finished 5th. Making her debut at the Japan Championships on the senior level, she placed 5th, and was named as a member of the Youth Olympic and the Junior World teams.

Programs

Competitive highlights 
GP: Grand Prix; CS: Challenger Series; JGP: Junior Grand Prix

Detailed results 
ISU Personal best highlighted in bold.

Senior level

Junior level

References

External links 

 

2001 births
Japanese female single skaters
Kansai University alumni
Living people
Sportspeople from Kyoto
Figure skaters at the 2016 Winter Youth Olympics